The Battle of Mammes or Battle of Mamma was an engagement between troops of the Byzantine Empire and an army of Moors in 534. The Byzantines were led by Solomon. The Moors used a tactic that had worked well with Vandals, they made a circle of camels which scared Byzantine horses to such an extent that horse archery became impractical. The Moors also hid some of their own cavalry in some nearby mountains. Solomon anticipated the trap and sent men to the side of the circle not facing the mountains. Due to the Moor formation these were not able to do much damage and when the Moors charged the fighting turned against them. Solomon then decided to attack the other side of the circle, predicting it to be weakened to such an extent that the hidden cavalry could not spring into action in time. Solomon’s prediction was correct, the Byzantines quickly broke through. They killed hundreds of camels, enslaved the Moor women and children and according to Procopius slew 10,000 men. The situation was not yet stabilized and the Moors soon returned but were decisively defeated at Mount Burgaon.

See also 
 Cutzinas
 Family tree of Byzantine emperors
 History of the Byzantine Empire
 Moorish wars

References 

Mammes
Mammes